Pagoda (or "Pagode" in Dutch) is an unobtrusive variation of an observation tower in the Efteling amusement park in the Netherlands.  It was designed by Ton van de Ven and started operating in 1987.

History and details

The Pagoda, developed by Intamin as a flying island, is described by Efteling as a "flying temple".

It consists of a 155 tons weighing cabin and a 225-ton hydraulic arm which pivots it from the ground up to a height of 60 metres.

The counterweight of 340 tons sinks 30 metres into the ground.

To maintain the balance of the cabin itself the weight of the 100 visitors is distributed over its two sides. 
The rotating cabin has a 15 metre high pagoda on top of it.

Etymology studies indicated that the word pagoda means tomb in Thai (ธาตุเจดีย). Preoccupied with upsetting a whole nation, as with Fata Morgana, Efteling choose the Dutch word "pagode" as the ride name.

Ride length: 4 minutes 
Ride capacity: 1500 passengers/ hour 
Cost: €3.6 million

References
 Company information
 Official ride website

Efteling
Amusement rides introduced in 1987
Towers completed in 1987
1987 establishments in the Netherlands
20th-century architecture in the Netherlands